Murray Price (31 August 1935 – 6 June 2016) was a South African cricketer. He played in 28 first-class matches for Border from 1955/56 to 1965/66. Aside from cricket, he also ran a stud farm.

See also
 List of Border representative cricketers

References

External links
 

1935 births
2016 deaths
South African cricketers
Border cricketers
People from Queenstown, South Africa
Cricketers from the Eastern Cape